Guanacaste Airport,  known before as Daniel Oduber Quirós International Airport , and also known as Liberia International Airport, is one of four international airports in Costa Rica.

History

The idea for an airport in Guanacaste Province was initially conceived during the government of Daniel Oduber Quirós (1974–1978). The airport was initially named "Llano Grande", due to the name of the area that it was built in. It would later be named "Aeropuerto Tomas Guardia," and the last name it received is that of ex-president Daniel Oduber Quirós, in honour of his work for the province of Guanacaste. However, most people call it "Liberia International Airport", and in 2021 the name was changed to Guanacaste Airport for branding purposes.

In October 1995 the airport was re-inaugurated as an international airport. To support this expansion of operations, the pavement on the runway was redone and special landing lights were installed. Also a firefighter station was added to comply with FAA and international regulations. Initial response from commercial airlines to the expansion was timid; however, after one year the airport went from having only one weekly charter flight to one almost every day.

In 2006, to manage increased demand of the airport, the government and local tourism chamber boards set aside funds to increase the parking capacity of the tarmac from five to eight airplanes, and for the construction of a parallel taxiway. However, the government made it clear that the solutions were only temporary and that a private company would need to be contracted to expand and operate the airport in the future. Also in 2007 a new waiting area and airport counters were opened, the airport was by then receiving more than 180,000 visitors yearly.

Expanded terminal and new operator
CORIPORT's shareholders include MMM Aviation Group, Emperador Pez Espada S.R.L., Inversiones Cielo Claro LTDA, Cocobolo Inversiones S.R.L., and ADC&HAS Airports Worldwide who is also the project's operator.

Construction started on 19 October 2010; the terminal opened on 12 January 2012. Further expansion of the terminal commenced in January 2017 and was completed in November; the expansion adds capacity for the airport to receive 5 new airlines.

Airlines and destinations

Statistics

Traffic figures

Top international destinations

https://www.guanacastecrairport.com/liberia-airport-shuttle-service==See also==
 Transport in Costa Rica
 List of airports in Costa Rica

References

External links
 https://www.liberiacrairport.com

Airports in Costa Rica
Buildings and structures in Guanacaste Province